Ahram may refer to:

Ahram, Iran, a city in Bushehr Province
Ahram Rural District
Ahram Canadian University
Ahram clothing
Transliteration of the Arabic word for pyramids, usually to refer to Pyramids of Giza

See also 
Al-Ahram (disambiguation)